NOMARS (No Manning Required, Ship) is a concept for a range of ships and smaller watercraft operating as unmanned surface vessels for the US Department of Defense, developed by the United States's Defense Advanced Research Projects Agency (DARPA).

These concept craft range in size and form. Examples include:

 Sea Hunter, a DARPA-developed trimaran USV launched in 2016.
 A dual hulled platform, proposed in a concept by Austal USA.
 A single hulled missile ship with a propulsor and steering pod.

By removing the human element from all ship design considerations, NOMARS will demonstrate significant advantages, to include size, cost (procurement, operations, and sustainment), at-sea reliability, survivability to sea-state, survivability to adversary actions (stealth considerations, resistance to tampering, etc.), and hydrodynamic efficiency (hull optimization without consideration for crew safety or comfort).

References

Unmanned surface vehicles of USA
DARPA projects
Autonomous ships